Paipai may refer to:
 Paipai people, an ethnic group of Mexico
 Paipai language, their language

See also 
 Kawana Pitiroi Paipai (? – 1884), a New Zealand leader
 Paepae, an element of traditional Maori houses
 Pay-Pay, a brand of cigarette rolling paper
 Pabai
 Baibai (disambiguation)